Twombley Glacier is a glacier 6 nautical miles (11 km) long, flowing from the north side of Kent Plateau into the south side of Byrd Glacier. Named by Advisory Committee on Antarctic Names (US-ACAN) for C.E. Twombley of the U.S. Weather Bureau, a member of the Little America V winter party, 1956.

Glaciers of Oates Land